A leadership election for the Mayors and Independents (STAN) in 2019 was held on 13 April 2019. The incumbent leader Petr Gazdík decided to not run for another term and was replaced by Vít Rakušan.

Background
Gazdík led the party since 2009. He was last elected in 2017. He decided to not run for another term stating that he doesn't want STAN to be a one-man party and that he wants to focus on education. Vít Rakušan was viewed as likeliest successor. Rakušan announced candidacy on 18 December 2018.

Voting
Election was held on 13 April 2019. Rakušan was the only candidate. He received 139 of 148 votes and thus won the election.

References

Mayors and Independents leadership elections
2019 elections in the Czech Republic
Indirect elections
Mayors and Independents leadership election
April 2019 events in the Czech Republic